Inferno is the eleventh studio album by guitarist Marty Friedman, released in 2014 through Prosthetic Records.

Track listing

Japanese Bonus tracks

Personnel

Main personnel
Marty Friedman - lead & rhythm guitar (all tracks)
Toshiki Oomomo - bass (tracks 1-3, 5-7, 11-12, 14)
Jens Bogren - mixing
Tony Lindgren - mastering

Additional musicians
Keshav Dhar - guitar (tracks 4, 13)
Danko Jones - vocals (tracks 5, 9, 13)
Daniel Tompkins - vocals (track 13)
Alexi Laiho - vocals, lead guitar (track 9)
Dave Davidson - vocals, guitar (track 8)
Anup Sastry - drums (tracks 1-9, 11-14)
Gregg Bissonette - drums (track 10)
Tony Franklin - bass (track 10)
Chris Aiken - bass (track 4, 13)
Jens Johansson - keyboards (track 10)
Ramin Sakurai - keyboards (tracks 2-3, 10)
Brian BecVar - keyboards (tracks 10, 14)
Wachu - keyboards (tracks 10, 14)
Nicolas Farmakalidis - piano, keyboards (tracks 6, 10, 14)
Jørgen Munkeby - saxophone (track 6)
Ewan Dobson - acoustic guitar (track 11)

Charts

References

External links
 Detailed song information from Marty's official website.

2014 albums
Marty Friedman albums
Prosthetic Records albums